Periyakomarasankulam Maha Vidyalayam ( Periyakōmaracaṉkuḷam Makā Vittiyālayam) is a provincial school in Periyakomarasankulam, Sri Lanka.

See also
 List of schools in Northern Province, Sri Lanka

References

External links
 Periyakomarasankulam Maha Vidyalayam
 Periyakomarasankulam Maha Vidyalayam

Provincial schools in Sri Lanka
Schools in Vavuniya District